Jaani Dyakha Hawbe is a 2011 Bengali film directed by Birsa Dasgupta and produced under the banner of Cine Nine. The film features actors Parambrata Chatterjee and Payel Sarkar in the lead roles. The musical score was composed by Indradeep Dasgupta.

Plot 
Megh (Parambrata Chatterjee) wants to be a musician and Hiya (Payel Sarkar) is an aspiring model. But both of them couldn't really establish themselves. They meet at a bookstore and fall in love with each other. But a time comes when they had to give more time for their career rather than their love. This resulted in a break-up, with its ill-effects on both lives. It was too late when they realised that they cannot stay without each other.

Pat (Shibprasad Mukhopadhyay) is a photographer who handles Hiya's portfolio. He promised Hiya to help her in establishing a career, but later turned out to be a liar who used her for some personal gains. On the other hand, Megh was trying to make an album under the label of Octane, a music company. One of its members was Minakshi (Roopa Ganguly), who tried to help Megh. Megh stayed on rent at Nirupama's (Mamata Shankar) place. It turned out that her ex-lover Ishwar (Anjan Dutt) became the drinking partner of Megh. When Nirupama was out of station, Ishwar secretly reside at her house with Megh, as both he and Nirupama didn't want to face each other. Ishwar was a poor man with no money and in fact, he had none in this world whom he could call as his own, except Nirupama. Their past turned out to be similar as of Megh and Hiya. Ishwar's original intention was to reunite Megh and Hiya. He was later helped by Nirupama, and in the meanwhile, both of them realised that they still loved each other. Finally, they were successful in their mission and all the four lives lived happy thereafter.

Cast 
 Parambrata Chatterjee as Megh
 Payel Sarkar as Hiya
 Anjan Dutt as Ishwar
 Roopa Ganguly as Minakshi
 Mamata Shankar as Nirupama
 Shiboprosad Mukherjee as Pat
 Arijit Dutta
 Arijit Roy

Soundtrack 

Indradeep Dasgupta and Neel Dutt composed the film score of Jaani Dyakha Hawbe. Lyrics are penned by Srijato and Angshuman Chakraborty. Music launch of the film took place at the INOX complex at Forum Mall, Kolkata. Singer Anupam Roy worked under another music director for the first time with this film, the rest all of his songs being his own compositions. Crew members like Payel Sarkar, Parambrata Chatterjee, Indradeep Dasgupta, Neel Dutt, Srijato and singer Kaushiki Chakrabarty were present during the music launch.

Track listing

Reception 
Soundtrack of Jaani Dyakha Hawbe was well received by critics. Reviewers of The Times of India wrote, "Music by Indradeep Dasgupta and Neel Dutt is another highpoint, especially Shreya Ghoshal's "Jaani Dyakha Hawbe" number. Indraadip goes a commendable job of using parts of the "Jo Wada Kiya Woh" in this song. Srijato excels yet again with his lyrics, especially that of "Phire Jaa" ("Megheder kachhe ghum jome achhe/jolchhobi aanka balishe/abchaya bnaake peyechhi tomake/aadore aar nalishe")." Similarly, critics of Washington Bangla Radio on Internet wrote, "The title track, with its interesting use of the evergreen "Jo Waada Kiya" is hummable. Neel’s best compositions seem to be reserved for his dad Anjan Dutt’s movies (somewhat similar to how we only get the best of Rajesh Roshan in Rakesh Roshan-directed films)."

Critical reception 

Jaani Dyakha Hawbe received average remarks from critics and reviewers. Critics of Washington Bangla Radio on Internet said, "Birsa is an accomplished storyteller, but if he really wants to enter the realm of mainstream cinema, he has to try again. The movie has an open-ended climax, with the audience left to judge whether Hiya and Megh actually become a couple once again, or whether it is all an extended, tragic, dream. The problem is, the viewers had stopped caring a long time back." Gomolo users rated it 3.5 out of 5 stars. Reviewers of The Times of India rated it 3 out of 5 stars and stating that Birsa didn't go deep into exploring the dynamics of relationships and the predicaments of some of his characters are often left unexplained. Shoma A. Chatterji of The Indian Express commented, "Strong technique, weak content".

Awards

References

External links 
 

Bengali-language Indian films
2010s Bengali-language films
Films directed by Birsa Dasgupta
Films scored by Indradeep Dasgupta